Edwin Smith Mills (born June 25, 1928) is an American economist known for his contributions to urban economics. Mills was a long-time faculty member at Johns Hopkins University (1957–1970), Princeton University (1970–1987), and Northwestern University (1987–1996).

A native of Collingswood, New Jersey, Mills graduated from Collingswood High School in 1946 and then served for two years as an officer with the United States Army Corps of Engineers. He attended Brown University and University of Birmingham.

References

External links 
 Website at Kellogg School of Business

1928 births
Living people
Collingswood High School alumni
People from Collingswood, New Jersey
Brown University alumni
Northwestern University faculty
Regional economists
Economists from New Jersey
United States Army officers
Military personnel from New Jersey